Guillaume Ducatel (born 21 January 1979 in Bully-les-Mines, Pas-de-Calais) is a French former footballer who played as a midfielder. He spent the majority of his playing career with Boulogne, appearing for the club in all of the top four divisions of the French football league system and playing more than 300 league games in total in a 13-year spell.

In November 2014, Ducatel was appointed manager of sixth-tier club Le Touquet.

Career
Ducatel began his career as part of the youth academy at French club RC Lens. He left the club in 2000, to join Championnat de France Amateurs side ES Wasquehal. Later that year, he joined French second tier club US Boulogne.

References

External links 
 

1979 births
Living people
People from Bully-les-Mines
French footballers
French football managers
RC Lens players
Wasquehal Football players
US Boulogne players
Ligue 1 players
Ligue 2 players
Championnat National players
Association football midfielders
Sportspeople from Pas-de-Calais
Footballers from Hauts-de-France